The Jubilee 150 Walkway, also variously known as the Jubilee 150 Commemorative Walk, the Jubilee 150 Walk, Jubilee 150 Plaques, the Jubilee Walk, or simply J150, is a series of (initially) 150 bronze plaques set into the pavement of North Terrace, Adelaide from King William Street to Pulteney Street. It was officially opened on 21 December 1986. It was commissioned as part of the celebrations commemorating the 150th anniversary of the founding of the British Province of South Australia on 28 December 1836.

The plaques contain the names and deeds of (initially) 170 people who made major contributions to the founding and development of South Australia. Since 1986, the Adelaide City Council has added four plaques.

The plaques are arranged in alphabetic order, and stretch from King William Road to Pulteney Street along the north side of North Terrace. The walkway starts at the South African War Memorial, and passes in front of Government House, the National War Memorial, the State Library, the Museum, the Art Gallery and the University of Adelaide. This portion of North Terrace also contains more than a dozen statues, busts and other memorial plaques, plus numerous public seating benches, some drinking fountains and some water features in front of the Museum and Art Gallery.

In 2011 the Adelaide City Council reorganised the area in front of Government House (between King William Road and the National War Memorial). The plaques and the major statues were not moved, but the avenue of gas lamps was removed, the various busts were moved from King William Road to an area between the statues of Venere Di Canova and Matthew Flinders, and a bust of Sir Lawrence Bragg was added to the group.

King William Street

The walkway starts near the corner of North Terrace and King William Street, in front of the front gates and gatehouse of Government House. The very corner is occupied by the South African War Memorial. Also on that corner, starting from the gatehouse and walking SE, were (prior to 2011) the busts of Sir Thomas John Mellis Napier, Mary Lee and Sir Mark Oliphant, all of whom have plaques on the walkway. These busts have been moved further east to the vicinity of the bust of Lord Florey, between the plaques for Kate Cocks and Sir Walter Crocker, and been replaced by the first six plaques of the walkway and seating.

Start of the Walkway

Plaques: Angas – Bagot

South African War Memorial

South African Boer War Memorial by A Jones 1904

Government House

This section of North Terrace in front of Government House has been named the Price Henry Gardens.

Prior to 2011, running along the fence of Government House, there was an "Avenue of Gas Lamps". This has been replaced by a broader footpath.

Plaques: Bagshaw – Bonython

Statue of Dame Roma Mitchell
The Honourable Dame Roma Mitchell, modelled by Janette Moore, sculpted by John Woffinden and Sally Francis, unveiled 1 July 1999.

Plaques: Bradman – Cawthorne

Statue: Venere Di Canova
Statue of Venus (Venere di Canova) donated by W. A. Horn in 1892. Somewhat controversial at the time of its unveiling in 1892, this piece was the first of Adelaide's street statues. It is a copy in Carrara marble of the statue of Venus by Antonio Canova – the original is at the Pitti Palace in Florence. (Photo of the original.) – Pedestal of Sicilian and Kapunda marble. Executed by Fraser & Draysey. Presented by Mr W. A. Horn. Unveiled 3 September 1892, by His Worship the Mayor (F.W. Bullock, Esq.).

Plaques: Chapman – Cocks

Busts
Prior to 2011, the bust of Lord Florey stood alone in this portion of the Price Henry Gardens.  The bust was completed by John Dowie in 1969, and unveiled by the Right Honourable the Lord Mayor (Robert E Porter, Esq.) on 25 June 1969.

After the 2011 reorganisation of the area, the bust of Florey was joined by the busts of Oliphant, Lee and Napier relocated from King William Street, and new busts (of Sir Lawrence Bragg and later Sir William Henry Bragg) were added to the group.

The three busts in their pre-2011 locations:

Sir Thomas John Mellis Napier by John Dowie, 1970. Unveiled by His Excellency the Governor-General of Australia, The Right Honourable Sir Paul Hasluck, C.M.G., G.C.V.O., K.St.J, 2 July 1970.

Mary Lee by Pat Moseley.

Sir Mark Oliphant by John Dowie, 1978.

Five busts in 2013. Six busts in 2017

Plaques: Crocker – Dickinson

Statue of Matthew Flinders
Captain Matthew Flinders by F. Brook Hitch, A.R.B.S. Pedestal of Murray Bridge red granite from Kirchel's quarry at Swanport. Paving of Tea Tree Gully freestone. Architect, A.E. Simpson, I.S.O., F.R.A.I.A. (Architect-in-Chief of subscription.) Unveiled 12 April 1934.

Plaques: Duguid – Gerrard

National War Memorial

National War Memorial – Great War – 1914–1918 by Woods, Bagot, Jory & Laybourne Smith; and Rayner Hoff, 1931.

Although the National War Memorial was initially proposed as a memorial to those who served in "The Great War", the site has since grown to incorporate a number of smaller memorials. These include a memorial to the Battle of Lone Pine; the "French Memorial", which commemorates those who fought and died in France during the first and second World Wars; an honour roll of those who died in World War II; and the "Australian Armed Forces Memorial", encompassing the Malayan Emergency of 1948–1960, the Korean War, the Indonesia–Malaysia confrontation in Borneo, and the Vietnam War. In addition, the wall which surrounds the northern and western sides of the site features the six "Crosses of Memory" – a series of "simple wooden crosses" commemorating the Siege of Tobruk from 1941 and the 10th, 27th, 48th and 50th battalions of 1916.

Plaques: Gibb – Gill

Kintore Avenue

The Institute building

Plaques: Gosse – Hall

Statue of Edward VII
Huge bronze statue of Edward VII by Sir Bertram Mackennal, K.C.V.O., R.A.
Pedestal designed by sculptor. Paid for by public subscription. Unveiled 15 July 1920.

Plaques: Hancock – Hartley

State Library of South Australia

The statue of Robert Burns bears the honour of being the first statue carved in Adelaide.  It was presented by the Caledonian Society, and unveiled on 5 May 1894 by the Chief of the Caledonian Society (Hon. J. Darling, M.L.C.).

Plaques: Hassell – Hill-Ling

Mortlock Library

Plaques: Holden – Jolly

Museum of Natural History

Plaques: Kavel – Mitchell

Art Gallery of South Australia

Plaques: Mitchell – Oliphant

University of Adelaide

Mitchell Building

Plaques: Playford – Short
Playford – Price

Statue of Sir Walter Watson Hughes (1803–1887)

Ramsay – Short

Statue of Sir Samuel Way
The Right Hon. Sir S.J. Way, Bart., P.C, D.C.L., LL.D. by Alfred Drury, R.A., A.R.C.A. 1924
Designed by Walter Bagot, F.R.I.B.A., F.R.A.I.A.  Erected by J. Tillett.
Pedestal of granite.  Paid for by public subscription.  Unveiled 17 November 1924.

Elder Conservatorium of Music

Plaques: Simpson – Stow

Statues of Sir Douglas Mawson and Sir Thomas Elder on Goodman Crescent in front of the Elder Conservatorium

Bonython Hall

Plaques: Strange – Todd

Napier Building

Plaques: Tolmer – Wright

Ligertwood Building

Last Plaque

End of Walkway

References and notes

Emily Potter, [http://www.api-network.com/cgi-bin/altitude21c/fly?page=Issue2&n=2 "How can you live in a city of monuments?": Reading Commemoration and Forgetting in Adelaide's North Terrace Precinct], Altitude vol 2, 2002.
 "S.A.'s greats : the men and women of the North Terrace plaques", edited by John Healey, Historical Society of South Australia, 2001. nla, UofA, UofA catalogue, Historical Society of SA. Reprinted 2002. Reprinted 2003.  (Note that James Park Woods VC is missing from this book.)
 "South Australian biographies, 1980", Blue Book of South Australia : Biographies Australia, 1980. nla
 "Biographical index of South Australians 1836–1885", editor: Jill Statton, South Australian Genealogy and Heraldry Society, 1986. nla
Stewart Cockburn, "Notable lives : profiles of 21 South Australians", Ferguson Publications, 1997. nla
Stewart Cockburn, "The patriarchs", Ferguson Publications, 1983. nla Back cover sub-title: The lives and philosophies of 30 distinguished South Australians.''
 "Late picking : vintage Jubilee 150", edited by Stella Guthrie, South Australian Council on the Ageing, 1986. nla

Tourist attractions in Adelaide
Walks of fame
History of South Australia
Adelaide Park Lands